Tender Forever is the pop electronica project of Franco-American musician Vito Valera. Valera has released four albums with K Records and now works on multimedia projects where they reside in Olympia, Washington.

Music
Valera began creating music in Bordeaux, France. They use many instruments including guitar, bass, keyboard, her computer, as well as more impromptu instruments such as wooden utensils. Valera, performing as Tender Forever, has toured in the US and in Europe with bands MEN, Rae Spoon, and others.

Work
Valera has worked on big scale multimedia projects, including collaborations with film maker Ted Passon, artist Nick Lally, producer Christopher Doulgeris, musician The Blow, and singer songwriter Mirah. Most recently, they performed at the Time-Based Art Festival in Portland, Oregon, the Whitney Museum of American Art in New York City, the Centre Georges Pompidou, La Cité Internationale Universitaire de Paris, and La Gaîté Lyrique in Paris. They received the RAAC (Regional Arts & Culture Council) Grant to complete a collaborative project called MAZED with Peter Burr and was invited to the Henry Art Gallery to lecture on reenactment and public source content. they are currently working and teaching at Evergreen State College in Olympia, Washington.

Discography

Albums
The Soft And The Hardcore (2005, K Records)
Wider (2007, K Records)
No Snare (2010, K Records)
Where Are We From (2011, K Records)

Compilation appearances
My Love (Justin Timberlake cover) on Reprises Inrocks no. 1 (2007, Les Inrockuptibles)

Collaborations
remix of Mirah's song Make It Hot on Joyride: Remixes (2006, K Records)

References

External links
Where Are We From EP Review on PopMatters
Performing Well I Can Take It and My Love (Justin Timberlake cover) for La Blogothèque
Interview on Polaroid Alla Radio
Interview with SSG by Nick Hilden
Interview with StarMag - TPS Star then performing "Got to Let Go" from the album No Snare

American indie rock musicians
K Records artists
American lesbian musicians
French LGBT musicians
1977 births
Living people
Musicians from Portland, Oregon
21st-century American women musicians